The Small Wars Manual is a United States Marine Corps manual on tactics and strategies for engaging in certain types of military operations.

The Marine Corps' role in small wars has a long and complex history. During the early years of the 20th century, the Corps was widely viewed as the nation's overseas police and initial response force. Moreover, the actual execution of these roles were a natural adjunct of the Corps' officially directed mission of sea-based power projection, in turn buttressed by its fundamental expeditionary operational character; i.e., the availability for "sudden and immediate call".

As a result of this "natural fit" and the experience of a series of guerrilla wars and military interventions in Central America and the Caribbean from the late 1890s through the early 1930s, loosely known as the Banana Wars, the Marine Corps began to systematically analyze the character and requirements of operations short of war proper, or "Small Wars". Major Samuel M. Harrington of the Marine Corps Schools delivered a formal report The Strategy and Tactics of Small Wars in 1921. In addition, Major C. J. Miller wrote a 154-page report on the 2nd Marine Brigade's operations in the Dominican Republic titled Diplomacy and Spurs in the Dominican Republic in 1923. Versions of these and other reports were serialized in The Marine Corps Gazette and additional articles on the subject appeared in
The Marine Corps Gazette and the Proceedings of the U.S. Naval Institute.

The results of these efforts were encapsulated in the manual Small Wars Operations in 1935. For the 1940 revision, it was renamed The Small Wars Manual (SWM). A classic of military science, based upon experience, not theory, it remains relevant today as the foundation of much current thinking and doctrine. It was encouraged reading by James Mattis for the 1st Marine Division in preparation for the Corps's return to the Iraq War as an occupation force.

Chapters

I. Introduction
II. Organization
III. Logistics
IV. Training
V. Initial operations
VI. Infantry patrols
VII. Mounted detachments
VIII. Convoys and convoy escorts
IX. Aviation
X. River operations
XI. Disarmament of population
XII. Armed native organizations
XIII. Military government
XIV. Supervision of elections
XV. Withdrawal

See also
 Charles Edward Callwell

Further reading
  
 
 
 Bickel, Keith B. Mars Learning: The Marine Corps' Development of Small Wars Doctrine, 1915-1940, Boulder, Colorado: Westview Press, 2001.
 Green, Lt. Col. T. N., The Guerrilla and How to Fight Him: Selections from the Marine Corps Gazette, ed. for the Marine Corps Gazette, New York: Praeger, 1962.

References

External links
 Small Wars Journal

Banana Wars
Military strategy books
Non-fiction books about the United States Marine Corps
United States Marine Corps in the 20th century
1921 books
1935 books
1940 books